The VMI–Virginia Tech football rivalry is an American college football rivalry between the Keydets of Virginia Military Institute and the Hokies of Virginia Tech, (formerly known as the Virginia Polytechnic Institute "Fighting Gobblers").  Due mainly to changes in classification, the teams last played in 1984, and are not scheduled to play again until 2026 - a 42-year gap.  The two teams are only about 80 miles apart in western Virginia and were in the same conference (the Southern Conference) from 1924 to 1964.

History

The two schools first met in 1894 and played annually from 1913 to 1971, usually in Roanoke on Thanksgiving Day. Like the current rivalry between VMI and The Citadel, the match-up was referred to as the Military Classic of the South, due to the military heritage of both schools. Starting again in 1973, the teams would continue to play on a yearly basis, making multiple appearances together in the Tobacco Bowl (1974, 1976) and Oyster Bowl (1980, 1982, 1984). The 1984 Oyster Bowl is the last time both teams played each other.
After the 1984 Oyster bowl, Virginia Tech led the series 49–25–5, At 79 games, it is the second-longest series for the Hokies and fourth-longest for the Keydets. Due to the long pause of the VMI-VPI series, the Virginia–Virginia Tech rivalry has emerged as the dominant one in the state.

Due to an agreement in 2017, Virginia Tech and VMI approved of a renewed one-time rivalry matchup on September 5, 2026 at Lane Stadium.

Game results

See also  
 List of NCAA college football rivalry games

References

College football rivalries in the United States
College sports in Virginia
Virginia Tech Hokies football
VMI Keydets football
1894 establishments in Virginia
Sports rivalries in Virginia